John McGinn (born 18 October 1994) is a Scottish professional footballer who plays as a midfielder for  club Aston Villa, where he is captain, and the Scotland national team. McGinn previously played for St Mirren and Hibernian, and also represented Scotland at the under-19 and under-21 levels. He made his full international debut in March 2016, representing Scotland at UEFA Euro 2020.

Club career

St Mirren
McGinn started his career as a youth player at St Mirren playing for the club's Ralston Academy. He broke into the first team in pre-season of the 2012–13 season, representing the club against English opposition Carlisle United and Accrington Stanley. In the same summer he also helped the under-20 side to victory in Kilbirnie Ladeside pre-season tournament, picking up joint player of the tournament with Jack Smith. McGinn made his competitive début against SPL champions Celtic in a 5–0 defeat, coming off the bench as a 78th-minute substitute.

On 29 November 2012, McGinn signed a new three-year contract, keeping him at St Mirren Park until summer 2015. McGinn played the first 81 minutes of the 2013 Scottish League Cup Final, as St Mirren won the League Cup by winning 3–2 against Hearts.

In April 2015, McGinn was "speared" in the thigh with a training pole thrown by St Mirren club captain Steven Thompson during a training session prank gone wrong. The resulting injury meant that McGinn missed the remainder of the season, and in turn he took legal action against the club.

Hibernian
On 31 July 2015, McGinn joined Hibernian on a four-year contract. Hibernian paid St Mirren a development fee for McGinn and promised them 30% of any future transfer fee. McGinn was part of the Hibernian team that won the 2015–16 Scottish Cup, the club's first victory in the competition for 114 years. In the following season, McGinn helped them win promotion to the Scottish Premiership.

Hibs rejected three offers from EFL Championship club Nottingham Forest for McGinn during August 2017. McGinn scored both of the Hibs goals in a 2–2 draw at Celtic on 30 September, and the first goal in a 2–1 win at Rangers on 3 February 2018. McGinn was one of four players nominated for the 2017–18 PFA Scotland Players' Player of the Year award.

Celtic made three offers for McGinn during July 2018, but these were all rejected by Hibernian. During this period of transfer speculation, McGinn continued to play regularly for Hibs and scored the winning goal in a Europa League qualifier against Asteras Tripolis. McGinn visited Aston Villa's training ground on 7 August to discuss a potential transfer, which was completed the following day.

Aston Villa
McGinn signed a four-year contract with Aston Villa on 8 August 2018 despite interest from Celtic. He made his debut for Villa in a 3–2 win against Wigan Athletic on 11 August, during which he provided an assist for the opening goal and his inswinging corner forced an own goal in the second half. McGinn scored his first goal in English football on 22 September, a swerving 25-yard volley in a 2–1 home defeat against Sheffield Wednesday which was later named EFL Championship goal of the season.

Despite consistent performances at his new club, which saw McGinn quickly become a new fan favourite, Villa began the season poorly, which eventually lead to the sacking of Steve Bruce as manager of the club in October 2018. Brentford manager Dean Smith was appointed as the new manager, and McGinn continued to be a key player in the Villa starting 11 for the new manager. The midfielder picked up his first goal under the new manager in a 3–0 win against Derby County and then picked up his first brace for the club in a 3–1 win over Nottingham Forest in March 2019. McGinn's good form continued, scoring goals against Middlesbrough and Sheffield Wednesday as Villa's form picked up heading into the final stages of the season. After picking up the club's Players' Player of the Season and Supporters' Player of the Season awards, McGinn scored the winner in the Championship Playoff Final to promote Aston Villa to the Premier League after 3 years in the Championship.

On 8 August 2019, McGinn signed a five-year contract with the club. He scored the first goal of Aston Villa's return to the Premier League in the first game of the season, in a 3–1 away defeat to Tottenham Hotspur on 10 August 2019. On 21 December 2019, McGinn suffered a fractured ankle in a 3–1 home defeat to Southampton and was expected to be out for up to three months. The break in the season caused by the COVID-19 pandemic meant that McGinn returned later in the same season, and he featured in all of Villa's remaining games as they achieved Premier League survival.

On 11 December 2020, McGinn signed a new five-year contract, which sees him extend his stay at Villa Park until 2025. Following the departure of club captain Jack Grealish, McGinn was announced as the new vice-captain on 14 August 2021. He scored in Villa's league opener, a 3–2 defeat against Watford.

On 27 July 2022, ahead of the new season, Aston Villa manager Steven Gerrard named McGinn as the new captain, with Emiliano Martínez replacing him as vice-captain.

International career
McGinn received an international call-up when he was selected as part of a Scotland under-19 squad for a training camp in Turkey in January 2013. He later went on to make his international debut for the under-19 side against Netherlands in a 2–1 defeat. McGinn then captained the under-19s against Serbia in Stara Pazova. On 5 March 2014, he made his debut for the Scotland under-21 side in a 2–2 draw against Hungary at Tannadice. McGinn later captained the under-21 team.

McGinn received his first call-up to the senior Scotland squad in March 2016, for a friendly against Denmark. McGinn played for the whole of the 1–0 win and was awarded man of the match.

McGinn scored his first goal for Scotland in September 2019, during a Euro 2020 qualification match with Russia. McGinn scored the first hat-trick in his career in a Euro 2020 qualifier against San Marino on 13 October 2019, with all his goals coming in the first half. Two goals against Kazakhstan meant that McGinn finished with a total of 7 goals in the Euro 2020 qualifying group.

With regular captain Andrew Robertson suspended, McGinn captained Scotland during a 1–0 win against the Czech Republic on 14 October 2020.

McGinn scored three goals for Scotland in March 2021 during the 2022 FIFA World Cup qualification matches: a bicycle kick in a 2–2 draw against Austria and two in a 4–0 win against the Faroe Islands. In September of that year he played the whole match in Vienna as Scotland defeated Austria 1–0; his brother Paul was introduced as a substitute in the second half, and they became only the third siblings to play together for the national team since the end of World War II.

McGinn won his 50th cap for Scotland on 24 September 2022, in a 2–1 win against Republic of Ireland. During that same international period he again captained the team, as Andrew Robertson was absent due to injury. McGinn wore the armband in the 0-0 UEFA Nations League draw with Ukraine, a result that secured first place in the group, promotion to the top level of the Nations League and a guaranteed play-off appearance in qualifying for UEFA Euro 2024.

Personal life
Raised in Clydebank where he attended St Peter the Apostle High School, John is the third of four children to parents Stephen and Mary. He has a twin sister, Katie, and his older brothers Stephen and Paul are also professional footballers. All three brothers have been with both St Mirren and Hibernian at some stage in their careers. Their grandfather Jack McGinn is a former Celtic chairman and Scottish Football Association president.

Career statistics

Club

International 

Scores and results list Scotland's goal tally first, score column indicates score after each McGinn goal.

Honours
St Mirren
Scottish League Cup: 2012–13

Hibernian
Scottish Cup: 2015–16
Scottish Championship: 2016–17

Aston Villa
EFL Championship play-offs: 2019

Individual
SFWA International Player of the Year (3): 2019–20, 2020–21, 2021–22
Aston Villa Player of the Season: 2018–19
Scottish Championship Player of the Season: 2016–17
Scottish Championship Player of the Month: November 2015, November 2016

See also
List of Scottish football families
List of Scotland national football team captains
 List of Scotland national football team hat-tricks

Notes

References

External links
Profile at the Aston Villa F.C. website

1994 births
Living people
Footballers from Glasgow
Sportspeople from Clydebank
Footballers from West Dunbartonshire
Scottish twins
Twin sportspeople
Scottish footballers
Association football midfielders
Scottish Premier League players
St Mirren F.C. players
Scottish Professional Football League players
Scotland youth international footballers
Scotland under-21 international footballers
Hibernian F.C. players
Scotland international footballers
Aston Villa F.C. players
English Football League players
Premier League players
UEFA Euro 2020 players